Millets are a highly varied group of small-seeded grasses, widely grown around the world as cereal crops or grains for fodder and human food. Most species generally referred to as millets belong to the tribe Paniceae, but some millets also belong to various other taxa.

Millets are important crops in the semiarid tropics of Asia and Africa (especially in South India, Mali, Nigeria, and Niger), with 97% of millet production in developing countries. This crop is favored due to its productivity and short growing season under dry, high-temperature conditions.

Millets are indigenous to many parts of the world. The most widely grown millets are sorghum and pearl millets, which are important crops in India and parts of Africa. Finger millet, proso millet, and foxtail millet are also important crop species.

Millets may have been consumed by humans for about 7,000 years and potentially had "a pivotal role in the rise of multi-crop agriculture and settled farming societies."

Description
Generally, millets are small-grained, annual, warm-weather cereals belonging to the grass family. They are highly tolerant of drought and other extreme weather conditions and have a similar nutrient content to other major cereals.

Millet species
The different species of millets are not necessarily closely related.  All are members of the family Poaceae (the grasses) but can belong to different tribes or even subfamilies.

The most commonly cultivated millets are in bold italic.

Eragrostideae tribe in the subfamily Chloridoideae:
 Eleusine coracana: Finger millet (also known as नागली or नाचणी in Marathi, ragi in Hindi, Kannada, రాగులు  in Telugu and கேழ்வரகு in Tamil)
 Eragrostis tef: Teff; often not considered to be a millet

Paniceae tribe in the subfamily Panicoideae:
 Genus Panicum:
 Panicum miliaceum: Proso millet (common millet, broomcorn millet, hog millet, or white millet, also known as baragu in Kannada, panivaragu in Tamil)
 Panicum sumatrense: Little millet (also known as Saamey in Kannada Samalu in Telugu and Sāmai in Tamil )
 Panicum sonorum: Sonoran millet, cultivated in the American Southwest
 Pennisetum glaucum: Pearl millet (known as Bajra in Hindi, also known as sajjey in Kannada and 'Kambu' in Tamil)

 Setaria italica: Foxtail millet, Italian millet, panic (also known as navaney in Kannada and 'thinai' in Tamil)
 Genus Digitaria: of minor importance as crops
 Digitaria exilis: known as white fonio, fonio millet, and hungry rice or acha rice
 Digitaria iburua: Black fonio
 Digitaria compacta: Raishan, cultivated in the Khasi Hills of northeast India
 Digitaria sanguinalis: Polish millet
 Genus Echinochloa: collectively, the members of this genus are called barnyard grasses or barnyard millets; other common names to identify these seeds include Jhangora, Samo seeds or Morio / Mario / Moraiaya seeds
Echinochloa esculenta: Japanese barnyard millet
 Echinochloa frumentacea: Indian barnyard millet, also known as Sawa millet, Kodisama in Telugu and Kuthirai vaali in Tamil and Bhagar or Varai in Marathi
Echinochloa oryzoides
Echinochloa stagnina: Burgu millet
Echinochloa crus-galli: Common barnyard grass (or Cockspur grass)
 Paspalum scrobiculatum: Kodo millet (also known as Arikelu in Telugu, Varagu in Tamil, Haraka in Kannada and Kodhra in Punjabi)

 Brachiaria deflexa: Guinea millet
 Brachiaria ramosa: Browntop millet (also known as Korle in Kannada)
 Spodiopogon formosanus: Taiwan oil millet, endemic to Taiwan

Andropogoneae tribe, also in the subfamily Panicoideae:
 Sorghum bicolor: Sorghum; usually considered a separate cereal, but sometimes known as great millet
 Coix lacryma-jobi: Job's tears, also known as adlay millet

History
The various species called millet were initially domesticated in different parts of the world most notably East Asia, South Asia, West Africa, and East Africa. However, the domesticated varieties have often spread well beyond their initial area.

Specialized archaeologists called palaeoethnobotanists, relying on data such as the relative abundance of charred grains found in archaeological sites, hypothesize that the cultivation of millets was of greater prevalence in prehistory than rice, especially in northern China and Korea. Millets also formed important parts of the prehistoric diet in Indian, Chinese Neolithic and Korean Mumun societies.

Domestication in East Asia 
Proso millet (Panicum miliaceum) and foxtail millet (Setaria italica) were important crops beginning in the Early Neolithic of China. Some of the earliest evidence of millet cultivation in China was found at Cishan (north), where proso millet husk phytoliths and biomolecular components have been identified around 10,300–8,700 years ago in storage pits along with remains of pit-houses, pottery, and stone tools related to millet cultivation. Evidence at Cishan for foxtail millet dates back to around 8,700 years ago. The oldest evidence of noodles in China were made from these two varieties of millet in a 4,000-year-old earthenware bowl containing well-preserved noodles found at the Lajia archaeological site in north China.

Palaeoethnobotanists have found evidence of the cultivation of millet in the Korean Peninsula dating to the Middle Jeulmun pottery period (around 3500–2000 BCE). Millet continued to be an important element in the intensive, multicropping agriculture of the Mumun pottery period (about 1500–300 BCE) in Korea. Millets and their wild ancestors, such as barnyard grass and panic grass, were also cultivated in Japan during the Jōmon period some time after 4000 BCE.

Chinese myths attribute the domestication of millet to Shennong, a legendary Emperor of China, and Hou Ji, whose name means Lord Millet.

Domestication in the Indian Subcontinent 
Little millet (Panicum sumatrense) is believed to have been domesticated around 5000 before present in India subcontinent and Kodo millet (Paspalum scrobiculatum) around 3700 before present, also in Indian subcontinent. Various millets have been mentioned in some of the Yajurveda texts, identifying foxtail millet (priyaṅgu), Barnyard millet (aṇu) and black finger millet (śyāmāka), indicating that millet cultivation was happening around 1200 BCE in India.Upon request by Indian Government in 2018, the Food and Agriculture Organisation of the United Nations(FAO) declared 2023 as International Year of Millets.

Domestication in West Africa 

Pearl millet (Pennisetum glaucum) was definitely domesticated in Africa by 3500 before present, though 8000 before present is thought likely. Early evidence includes finds at Birimi in West Africa with the earliest at Dhar Tichitt in Mauritania.

Pearl millet was domesticated in the Sahel region of West Africa, where its wild ancestors are found. Evidence for the cultivation of pearl millet in Mali dates back to 2500 BCE, and pearl millet is found in the Indian subcontinent by 2300 BCE.

Domestication in East Africa 
Finger millet is originally native to the highlands of East Africa and was domesticated before the third millennium BCE. Its cultivation had spread to South India by 1800 BCE.

Spreading 
The cultivation of common millet as the earliest dry crop in East Asia has been attributed to its resistance to drought, and this has been suggested to have aided its spread.
Asian varieties of millet made their way from China to the Black Sea region of Europe by 5000 BCE.

Millet was growing wild in Greece as early as 3000 BCE, and bulk storage containers for millet have been found from the Late Bronze Age in Macedonia and northern Greece. Hesiod describes that "the beards grow round the millet, which men sow in summer." And millet is listed along with wheat in the third century BCE by Theophrastus in his "Enquiry into Plants".

Research 
Research on millets is carried out by the International Crops Research Institute for the Semi-Arid Tropics (ICRISAT) and ICAR-Indian Institute of Millets Research in Telangana, India, and by the United States Department of Agriculture's Agricultural Research Service at Tifton, Georgia, United States.

Cultivation
Pearl millet is one of the two major crops in the semiarid, impoverished, less fertile agriculture regions of Africa and southeast Asia. Millets are not only adapted to poor, dry infertile soils, but they are also more reliable under these conditions than most other grain crops. This has, in part, made millet production popular, particularly in countries surrounding the Sahara in western Africa.

Millets, however, do respond to high fertility and moisture. On a per-hectare basis, millet grain production can be 2–4 times higher with use of irrigation and soil supplements. Improved breeds of millet with enhanced disease resistance can significantly increase farm yield. There has been cooperation between poor countries to improve millet yields. For example, 'Okashana 1', a variety developed in India from a natural-growing millet variety in Burkina Faso, doubled yields. This breed was selected for trials in Zimbabwe. From there it was taken to Namibia, where it was released in 1990 and enthusiastically adopted by farmers. 'Okashana 1' became the most popular variety in Namibia, the only non-Sahelian country where pearl millet—locally known as mahangu—is the dominant food staple for consumers. 'Okashana 1' was then introduced to Chad. The breed has significantly enhanced yields in Mauritania and Benin.

Production

In 2020, global production of millet was 30.5 million tonnes, led by India with 41% of the world total (table). Niger also had significant production.

Alcoholic beverages

In India, various alcoholic beverages are produced from millets. Millet is also the base ingredient for the distilled liquor rakshi.

As a food source

Millets are major food sources in arid and semiarid regions of the world, and feature in the traditional cuisine of many others. In western India, sorghum (called jowar, jola, jonnalu, jwaarie, or jondhahlaa in Gujarati, Kannada, Telugu, Hindi and Marathi languages, respectively; mutthaari, kora, or panjappullu in Malayalam; or cholam in Tamil) has been commonly used with millet flour (called jowari in western India) for hundreds of years to make the local staple, hand-rolled (that is, made without a rolling pin) flat bread (rotla in Gujarati, bhakri in Marathi, or roti in other languages). Another cereal grain popularly used in rural areas and by poor people to consume as a staple in the form of roti. Other millets such as ragi (finger millet) in Karnataka, naachanie in Maharashtra, or kezhvaragu in Tamil, "ragulu" in Telugu, with the popular ragi rotti and Ragi mudde is a popular meal in Karnataka. Ragi, as it is popularly known, is dark in color like rye, but rougher in texture.

Millet porridge is a traditional food in Russian, German, and Chinese сuisines. In Russia, it is eaten sweet (with milk and sugar added at the end of the cooking process) or savoury with meat or vegetable stews. In China, it is eaten without milk or sugar, frequently with beans, sweet potato, and/or various types of squash. In Germany, it is also eaten sweet, boiled in water with apples added during the boiling process and honey added during the cooling process.

Millet is also the main ingredient in a Vietnamese sweet snack called bánh đa kê. It contains a layer of smashed millet and mungbean topped with sliced dried coconut meat wrapped in a crunchy rice cake. It is a specialty of Hanoi.

Per capita consumption of millets as food varies in different parts of the world, with consumption being the highest in Western Africa. In the Sahel region, millet is estimated to account for about 35 percent of total cereal food consumption in Burkina Faso, Chad and the Gambia. In Mali and Senegal, millets constitute roughly 40 percent of total cereal food consumption per capita, while in Niger and arid Namibia it is over 65 percent (see mahangu). Other countries in Africa where millets are a significant food source include Ethiopia, Nigeria and Uganda. Millet is also an important food item for the population living in the drier parts of many other countries, especially in eastern and central Africa, and in the northern coastal countries of western Africa. In developing countries outside Africa, millet has local significance as a food in parts of some countries, such as China, India, Burma and North Korea.

The use of millets as food fell between the 1970s and the 2000s, both in urban and rural areas, as developing countries such as India have experienced rapid economic growth and witnessed a significant increase in per capita consumption of other cereals.

People affected by gluten-related disorders, such as coeliac disease, non-celiac gluten sensitivity and wheat allergy sufferers, who need a gluten-free diet, can replace gluten-containing cereals in their diets with millet. Nevertheless, while millet does not contain gluten, its grains and flour may be contaminated with gluten-containing cereals.

It is a common ingredient in seeded bread.

Millets are also used as bird and animal feed.

Grazing millet
In addition to being used for seed, millet is also used as a grazing forage crop. Instead of letting the plant reach maturity, it can be grazed by stock and is commonly used for sheep and cattle.

Millet is a C4 plant, which means that it has good water-use efficiency and utilizes high temperature and is therefore a summer crop.  A C4 plant uses a different enzyme in photosynthesis from C3 plants, and this is why it improves water efficiency.

In southern Australia millet is used as a summer quality pasture, utilizing warm temperatures and summer storms. Millet is frost-sensitive and is sown after the frost period, once soil temperature has stabilised at 14 °C or higher. It is sown at a shallow depth.

Millet grows rapidly and can be grazed 5–7 weeks after sowing, when it is 20–30 cm high.  The highest feed value is from the young green leaf and shoots. The plant can quickly come to head, so it must be managed accordingly because as the plant matures, the value and palatability of feed reduces.

The Japanese millets (Echinochloa esculenta) are considered the best for grazing and in particular Shirohie, a new variety of Japanese millet, is the best suited variety for grazing.  This is due to a number of factors: it gives better regrowth and is later to mature compared to other Japanese millets; it is cheap – cost of seed is $2–$3 per kg, and sowing rates are around 10 tons per hectare for dryland production; it is quick to establish, can be grazed early, and is suitable for both sheep and cattle.

Compared to forage sorghum, which is grown as an alternative grazing forage, animals gain weight faster on millet, and it has better hay or silage potential, although it produces less dry matter.  Lambs do better on millet compared to sorghum.  Millet does not contain prussic acid, which can be in sorghum.  Prussic acid poisons animals by inhibiting oxygen utilisation by the cells and is transported in the blood around the body — ultimately the animal will die from asphyxia.   There is no need for additional feed supplements such as Sulphur or salt blocks with millet.

The rapid growth of millet as a grazing crop allows flexibility in its use.  Farmers can wait until sufficient late spring / summer moisture is present and then make use of it.  It is ideally suited to irrigation where livestock finishing is required.

Nutrition

A  reference serving of raw millet (Panicum miliaceum or proso millet) provides  of food energy and is a rich source (20% or more of the Daily Value, DV) of protein, dietary fiber, several B vitamins and numerous dietary minerals, especially manganese at 76% DV (USDA nutrient table). Raw millet is 9% water, 73% carbohydrates, 4% fat and 11% protein (table).

Comparison with other major staple foods
The following table shows the nutrient content of millet compared to major staple foods in a raw form. Raw forms, however, are not edible and cannot be fully digested. These must be prepared and cooked as appropriate for human consumption. In processed and cooked form, the relative nutritional and antinutritional contents of each of these grains is remarkably different from that of raw forms reported in this table. The nutritional value in the cooked form depends on the cooking method.

See also

 Brukina – a Ghanaian name for a drink made of millet and milk
 Fura (food)
 List of ancient dishes and foods
 List of insect pests of millets

References

Notes

Citations

Bibliography

External links

 

Cereals
Plant common names